Dietmar Gedde (born 11 February 1936) is a German sailor. He competed at the 1964 Summer Olympics and the 1972 Summer Olympics.

References

External links
 

1936 births
Living people
German male sailors (sport)
Olympic sailors of the United Team of Germany
Olympic sailors of East Germany
Sailors at the 1964 Summer Olympics – Flying Dutchman
Sailors at the 1972 Summer Olympics – Flying Dutchman
Sportspeople from Magdeburg